Trifekta is the name of a now defunct Australia based independent record label, based in Fitzroy, Victoria. It was started in 1997 by Tom Larnach-Jones (Shock Records), Tim Everest and Paul 'Presser' Towner (Gerling).

The first release for the label was debut release for The Avalanches, a limited edition 7" single entitled "Rock City". This was followed by another limited edition 7" single, this time Gerling's "Bachelor Pad" single. Towner returned to Sydney and not long after this, Everest left the label in the hands of Larnach-Jones, so that he could focus on his fashion label Schwipe.

Artists
Bands released on the Trifekta label include:
 The Crayon Fields
 Deerhoof
 Magnolia Electric Co.
 Minimum Chips
 Mountains in the Sky
 Preston School of Industry
 Xiu Xiu
 Architecture in Helsinki
 Art of Fighting
 The Avalanches
 The Decemberists
 Dynomite D
 Gerling
 Gersey
 The Go-Betweens
 Life Without Buildings
 Motor Vehicle Sundown
 Ninetynine
 Sodastream 
 Songs: Ohia
 Superchunk
 Ukiyo-e
 Via Tania
 Your Wedding Night

See also
 List of record labels
 Australian indie rock

References

Record labels established in 1997
Trifekta
Indie rock record labels
Defunct record labels of Australia